Madina Demba Forest Park  is a forest park in the Gambia. Established on January 1, 1954, it covers 2373 hectares.

Madina Demba Forest Park has an elevation of 50 metres. It is situated southeast of Mban.

References
  
 

Protected areas established in 1954
Forest parks of the Gambia